Lukas Wedl (born 19 October 1995) is an Austrian footballer currently playing for Austria Wien.

Club career
On 31 August 2021, he moved to Austria Wien.

References

External links
 

1995 births
Living people
Austrian footballers
FC Wacker Innsbruck (2002) players
FK Austria Wien players
2. Liga (Austria) players
Association football goalkeepers
People from Amstetten, Lower Austria
Footballers from Lower Austria